The hymenopteran family Scelionidae is a very large cosmopolitan group (over 3000 described species in some 176 genera) of exclusively parasitoid wasps, mostly small (0.5–10 mm), often black, often highly sculptured, with (typically) elbowed antennae that have a 9- or 10-segmented flagellum. It was once considered to be a subfamily of the Platygastridae, but has been revived in the most recent classification of Platygastroidea.

They are generally idiobionts, attacking the eggs of many different types of insects, spiders, butterflies (the hackberry emperor, for example) and many are important in biological control. Several genera are wingless, and a few attack aquatic insect eggs underwater.

References

External links
Cedar Creek Pinned specimen images.
 Paper on the Genus Thoron.

Platygastroidea
Apocrita families
Biological pest control wasps